The Sri Lanka national field hockey team represents Sri Lanka in international field hockey competitions. It is ranked as the third best nation in the South Asian region behind India, Pakistan and ranked  in the world.

Sri Lanka was once considered as a better side in 1970s but failed to perform well at the international level for about four decades. The field hockey team from Sri Lanka participated in the Hockey World League for the first time in their history when they took part in the 2016–17 Men's FIH Hockey World League Round 1 and they performed really well by defeating every team that they had played in pool matches. They also qualified for the finals of the Hockey World League Round 1 in the Asian category. In the finals Sri Lanka played a draw in full-time against China, with 3 goals from each team. China went on to win the final by scoring 4-2 in the penalty shootout and Sri Lanka secured the silver medal at the end of  Round 1 competition. After emerging as runners-up the Sri Lankan team qualified to play in the 2016-17 Men's FIH Hockey World League Round 2. But Sri Lanka could not manage to win even a single game and crashed out from the FIH Hockey World League. In Round 2 Sri Lanka secured 7th place by beating Fiji in the 7th place playoff.

In 2016, Sri Lanka made history by qualifying to play in the finals of the Asian Hockey Federation Cup. This was the first time Sri Lanka qualified to play in the finals of the Asian Hockey Federation Cup. In the finals Sri Lanka lost 0-3 to Bangladesh and secured the silver medal.

Sri Lanka also qualified to compete at the 2018 Asian Games in the men's team event after a third place finish in the Asian Games qualification round

Tournament History

Asian Games
 1962 – 7th
 1966 – 5th
 1970 – 6th
 1974 – 5th
 1978 – 7th
 2014 – 10th
 2018 – 8th
 2022 – Qualified

Asia Cup
 1982 – 7th
 1985 – 8th
 1999 – 9th
 2007 – 9th

AHF Cup
1997 – 
2002 – 
2008 – 4th place
2012 – 
2016 – 
 2022 –

Hockey World League 
 2012–13 – Round 1
 2014–15 – Round 1
 2016–17 – 33rd

South Asian Games 
 1995 – 4th place
 2006 – 
 2010 – 4th place
 2016 – 4th place

References 

Asian men's national field hockey teams
Field hockey
National team